Ria Christina Gerodias Fariñas (born March 6, 1984) is a Filipino politician who represented the 1st District of Ilocos Norte in the Philippine House of Representatives from 2019 to 2022.

Career
On May 13, 2019, she won the congressional election for the 1st District of Ilocos Norte by 106,000 votes defeating Ryan Remigio of the Nacionalista Party by 60,000 votes making her the first female representative of Ilocos Norte's 1st District.

On May 9, 2022, she was defeated by Sandro Marcos, the son of the presidential candidate, Bongbong Marcos. Marcos received 108,423 votes while Fariñas received 83,034 votes.

References

1984 births
Living people
Members of the House of Representatives of the Philippines from Ilocos Norte
People from Laoag
PDP–Laban politicians